Águas Claras is a Federal District Metro brazilian station on Orange and Green lines. It was opened on 31 March 2001 on the inaugural section of the line, from Central to Terminal Samambaia and Praça do Relógio. This is the westernmost joint station of Orange and Green lines. The adjacent stations are Arniqueiras (Orange and Green lines), Taguatinga Sul (Orange line), and Concessionárias (Green line).

References

Brasília Metro stations
2001 establishments in Brazil
Railway stations opened in 2001